Ambi Pur is a brand of air freshener products owned by Procter & Gamble. It was first launched on June 10, 1976, in Spain, and is now sold worldwide.

History 
Ambi-Pur's first product was launched in 1958 in Spain by Cruz Verde.

In 1984, the Sara Lee Corporation acquired Cruz Verde. It was the first brand to launch a plug-in liquid air freshener.

On 11 December 2009, Procter & Gamble announced it would acquire the Ambi-Pur air care business from the Sara Lee Corporation for €320 million.

References

Procter & Gamble brands
Cleaning product brands
Products introduced in 1958
2009 mergers and acquisitions